Adamclisi is a commune in Constanța County, in the Dobrogea region of Romania.

History

In ancient times, a Roman castrum named Civitas Tropaensium was settled here and in 109 AD a monument named Tropaeum Traiani was built to commemorate the Roman Empire's victories over the Dacians.

Colonized with Roman veterans of the Dacian Wars, the city was the largest Roman city of Scythia Minor and became a municipium in the year 170. Destroyed by the Goths, it was rebuilt during the rule of Constantine the Great with better defensive walls, which defended the city successfully until the Avars sacked it in 587. After that moment, it ceased to be among the  important cities of Dobrogea and was no longer mentioned for seven hundred years.

During the Ottoman rule, the village was re-founded by Turkish settlers. After Dobruja was awarded to Romania, in 1878, the Muslim population left for Turkey, leaving the village deserted. However, in 1880 – 1881, the village was re-settled with Romanians from Transylvania and Teleorman.

Etymology
The current name has a Turkish origin and it is an adaptation in Romanian of "Adam Kilisse" which means "the church of man" (when the Turkish people settled in this area, they thought the Ancient Roman monument was a church).

Villages
Villages in the Adamclisi commune:
 Adamclisi
 Abrud (historical name: Mulciova) - named after Abrud, Alba County
 Hațeg (historical name: Arabagi) - named after Hațeg, Hunedoara County
 Urluia (historical name: Urluchioi)
 Zorile (historical name: Cherimcuius)

Demographics
At the 2011 census, Adamclisi had 2,092 Romanians (97.30%), 42 Turks (1.95%), 8 others (0.37%), 8 with undeclared ethnicity (0.37%).

Natives
Marian Dinu
Aurel Rădulescu

References

External links
Data about Adamclisi on County council webpage

Communes in Constanța County
Localities in Northern Dobruja
Place names of Turkish origin in Romania